Magnolia champaca, known in English as champak, is a large evergreen tree in the family Magnoliaceae. It was previously classified as Michelia champaca. It is known for its fragrant flowers, and its timber used in woodworking.

Etymology
The species epithet, champaca, comes from the Sanskrit word .

Vernacular names
Other vernacular names in English include joy perfume tree, yellow jade orchid tree and fragrant Himalayan champaca.

Distribution and habitat
The tree is native to the Indomalayan realm, consisting of South Asia, Southeast Asia−Indochina, and southern China.

It is native to Maldives, Bangladesh, Cambodia, China, India, Indonesia, Malaysia, Myanmar, Nepal, Thailand, and Vietnam. In China it is native to southern Xizang and southern and southwestern Yunnan Provinces. In 2021, an isolated, presumably native population of M. champaca was identified in Yemen, making M. champaca the only species in the Magnoliaceae known to inhabit the Arabian Peninsula.

Description

The tree has a narrow umbelliform crown.

It has strongly fragrant flowers in varying shades of cream to yellow-orange which bloom during June to September. The obovoid-ellipsoid carpels produce 2−4 seeds during September to October.

Varieties—hybrids
Magnolia champaca varieties and hybrids include:
Magnolia (Michelia) champaca var. champaca — Huang lan (yuan bian zhong), (黄兰(原变种)) in Chinese.
Magnolia (Michelia) champaca var. pubinervia — Mao ye mai huang lan (毛叶脉黄兰) in Chinese.
Magnolia × alba — white-flowered hybrid of Magnolia champaca and Magnolia montana.

In Thailand, there are other purported hybrids cultivated with other species, including with Magnolia liliifera and Magnolia coco.

Cultural aspects

In Theravada Buddhism, champaca is said to have been used as the tree for achieving enlightenment, or Bodhi, by the fourteenth Buddha called "Aththadassi - අත්ථදස්සි". According to Tibetan beliefs, the Buddha of the next era will find enlightenment under the white flower canopy of the champaca tree.

Uses

Fragrance
The flowers are used in South Asia for several purposes. Especially in India, they are primarily used for worship at temples, whether at home or out, and more generally worn in hair by girls and women as a means of beauty ornament as well as a natural perfume. Flowers are floated in bowls of water to scent the room, as a fragrant decoration for bridal beds, and for garlands.

"Magnolia champaca, however, is more rare and has a strong perfume, and is not that commonly or plentifully used - for example in hair it is worn singly or as a small corsage but rarely as a whole garland, and for bridal beds it is most often jasmine and roses while for bowls of water to be placed around rooms usually other, more colourful for visual decoration and less strongly perfumed flowers are used."

The tree was traditionally used to make fragrant hair and massage oils. Jean Patou’s famous perfume, 'Joy', the second best selling perfume in the world after Chanel No. 5, is derived in part from the essential oils of champaca flowers. The vernacular name "Joy perfume tree" comes from this. Many niche perfumers are now once again using Champaca Absolute as single note fragrances.

The scent similar to the scent of this plant is said to emit by a civet in Sri Lanka, Paradoxurus montanus. Because all the other civets are known to emit very unpleasant odours, this species is renowned to emit pleasant odour similar to this plant's scent.

Timber

In its native India and Southeast Asia, champaca is logged for its valuable timber.  It has a finely textured, dark brown and olive-colored wood, which is used in furniture making, construction, and cabinetry.

The species is protected from logging in some states of India, especially in the Southwestern region, where certain groves are considered sacred by Hindus and Buddhists.

Cultivation
Magnolia champaca is cultivated by specialty plant nurseries as an ornamental plant, for its form as an ornamental tree, as a dense screening hedge, and for its fragrant flowers.  It is  planted in the ground in tropical and in subtropical climate gardens, such as in coastal Southern and Central California.  It is planted in containers in cooler temperate climates. It requires full sun and regular watering.

The fragrant flowers attract butterflies and hummingbirds. Its aril-covered seeds are highly attractive to birds.

References

Further reading
Fernando, M. Thilina R., et al. "Identifying dormancy class and storage behaviour of champak (Magnolia champaca) seeds, an important tropical timber tree." Journal of the National Science Foundation of Sri Lanka 41.2 (2013): 141-146.

External links

 Chittagong University, Bangladesh: Michelia champaca - detailed information

champaca
Trees of China
Flora of tropical Asia
Plants described in 1753
Garden plants of Asia
Ornamental trees
Taxa named by Henri Ernest Baillon
Taxa named by Carl Linnaeus
Taxa named by Jean Baptiste Louis Pierre